Irecha was the title held by the ruler of the Purépecha Empire, which existed from the 14th to the 16th centuries in the area of the modern mexican states of Michoacán, Guerrero, Jalisco, Guanajuato, and the State of Mexico.

The Wakusïcha
Pawakume, T'ikatame, and Karapu are all recognized as irecha in a few sources, though they precede the formation of the Irechikwa by about three centuries. However, the three are credited as ancestral forebearers of it; whether they actually held the title or if this is a posthumous addition by indigenous authors remains unknown. Regardless, later members of the Wakusïcha line are not recognized in this manner until Tarhiakurhi.

References

Purépecha
Royal titles
Former monarchies of North America
Royalty in the Americas
Titles and offices of Native American leaders